The Irish Self-Determination League of Great Britain (ISDL) was established in London in 1919. In May 1920 a similar organisation was established in Montreal, The Irish Self-Determination League of Canada and Newfoundland.

On 11 March 1923 over 100 members and suspected members (male and female) of the League in Britain, were arrested in London, Glasgow and Liverpool in a series of dawn raids. The arrests were made during the height of the Irish Civil War at the behest of the Irish Free State. Those arrested, including both Irish and those born in Britain, were taken to either Liverpool or the Clyde where they were placed on destroyers and deported to Ireland.

The British government used legislation supposedly under the Restoration of Order in Ireland Act 1920, however the deportees subsequently sued the British government for compensation. The detentions were successfully challenged through the British courts ending with a House of Lords ruling that there was no legal basis for the deportation and resulting in compensation being paid to the men involved. 

James Hickey, one of the deportees from Glasgow, was beaten whilst in prison in Ireland and as a result lost the hearing in his right ear. Along with all the deportees he was awarded compensation for his illegal arrest and imprisonment. On 1 October 1923 he was awarded £750 plus 100 guineas expenses. This was considerably more than the vast majority of his fellow Scottish deportees who were awarded an average of £389 plus 25 guineas. The reason cited for the difference in these sums given in the Times is that he was a businessman. He subsequently left Scotland and moved, with his family, to Dublin.

Others deported included Anthony Mullarkey of Bedlington, Northumberland. He had previously been imprisoned at Wormwood Scrubs, having been identified as Commanding Officer of the IRA in Newcastle upon Tyne. A coal miner by trade he had served with the Tyneside Irish Brigade (25th (2nd Tyneside Irish) Battalion, Northumberland Fusiliers) in World War I.

Another deportee was Art O'Brian, editor of The League's London-based newspaper, The Irish Exile whose circulation peaked at 10,000 copies. The newspaper expressed disappointment with the 1921 Anglo-Irish Treaty. It ceased circulation in 1922, the same year that the ISDL itself disbanded.

References

1919 establishments in the United Kingdom
Irish diaspora in the United Kingdom
Political history of Ireland